I Left My Heart in San Francisco is an album by Tony Bennett, released in 1962 on Columbia Records. It peaked at #5 on the Billboard pop albums chart, and has been certified platinum by the RIAA. Originally available as Columbia rekey CL 1869 (mono) and CS 8669 (stereo), it is one of the best-selling albums of Bennett's career.

Tony Bennett won two 1962 Grammy Awards for the title song: Record of the Year and Best Solo Vocal Performance, Male.

Content
In February 1962, the song "I Left My Heart in San Francisco" was released by Columbia as the b-side to "Once Upon a Time", but became a chart hit in its own right. Columbia assembled the album around the single, including material that had been previously released on singles and unused items from earlier sessions.

Previously released songs included "The Best Is Yet to Come", which had been introduced by Bennett and released as Columbia single 41965 in February 1961, with "Marry Young" on the flipside. Both songs were by the team of Cy Coleman and Carolyn Leigh, their "Rules of the Road" the b-side to Columbia 42135 "Close Your Eyes" released August 11, 1961. Another single, "Candy Kisses" recorded in March 1961 with "Have I Told You Lately?" from I Can Get It for You Wholesale recorded at the same January 23, 1962 sessions that yielded the title song, were Columbia 42395 on March 30, 1962. "Tender Is the Night", later used in the 1962 film, had been Columbia 42219, released October 27, 1961, while Charlie Chaplin's "Smile" from Modern Times peaked at #73 on the Billboard Hot 100 as Columbia 41434, released July 6, 1959. None of the other singles, with the exception of "San Francisco", had charted.

The additional three tracks were taken from sessions spanning 1957 to 1960. "Taking a Chance on Love" derived from the musical Cabin in the Sky, "Love for Sale" from The New Yorkers, and "I'm Always Chasing Rainbows" from Oh, Look!. Bennett's rescue of "Once Upon a Time" from All American gave him "San Francisco" instead, his signature song.

Track listing

Side one

Side two

Personnel
 Tony Bennett — vocals
 Ralph Sharon — piano; arrangements on "Love for Sale"
 The Count Basie Orchestra — instruments and arrangements on "Taking A Chance on Love"
 Marty Manning — arrangements on "San Francisco," "Once Upon A Time," "Tender is the Night," "Candy Kisses," and "Have I Told You Lately?"
 Cy Coleman — arrangements on "Marry Young" and "The Best Is Yet to Come"
 Ralph Burns — arrangements on "Smile" and "Rules of the Road"
 Frank De Vol — arrangements on "I'm Always Chasing Rainbows"
 Candido Camero, Sabu Martinez, and Billy Exiner — percussion on "Love for Sale"

References

1962 albums
Tony Bennett albums
Columbia Records albums
Albums arranged by Frank De Vol
Albums produced by Mitch Miller
Albums produced by Al Ham
Albums recorded at CBS 30th Street Studio
Albums arranged by Ralph Sharon
Albums arranged by Cy Coleman
Albums arranged by Ralph Burns